ShVSM Kyiv was an ice hockey team in Kyiv, Ukraine. The abbreviation stands for the School of Higher Sports Mastery. ShVSM is a network of sports schools across Ukraine.

History
During Soviet times, the team participated in the second and third-level leagues, the Pervaya Liga and the Vtoraya Liga. After Ukraine became independent, ShVSM began participating in the Ukrainian Hockey Championship. They played in the championship for three seasons from 1993-1995, winning the title in 1994.

Achievements
Ukrainian champion (1): 1994.

References

External links
Team profile on eurohockey.com
School at the Kyiv city's website
List of all schools of Higher Sports Mastery at the website of Ministry of Sport.

Ice hockey teams in Ukraine
College sports teams in Ukraine
Sport in Kyiv